Chinese National Human Genome Center (国家人类基因组北方研究中心), Beijing  (CHGB), was established as one of the national-level genome research center approved by the Ministry of Science & Technology. CHGB coordinates scientific activities in human genome research with the Chinese Academy of Medical Sciences(CAMS), Peking University, Academy of Military Medical Sciences, Chinese Academy of Science(CAS), Chinese National Human Genome Center at Shanghai (国家人类基因组南方研究中心), Microbial Genome Center at Ministry of Health, Tsinghua University, CAS Institute of Biophysics Academia Sinica, Peking Union Hospital, Beijing Fuwai Hospital, Cancer Hospital at CAMS, Beijing Cancer Hospital, Peking University First Hospital, People's Hospital of Peking University, PLA General Hospital, Tianjin Medical University, Roche Co. etc.

CHGB takes on Chinese important scientific and technological projects and impels genomics and proteomics in the world. In next several years, CHGB continues to serve for and support China important scientific and technological projects, set up and develop functional genomics research platform, train an excellent group, aiming at promoting competitive power and CHGB's value.

CHGB  promotes the commercialization of research products and initiate genome industry in China. As a national research institution, CHGB integrates all high-level activities in basic research, clinical investigation, population genetics and bioinformatics projects in Beijing and North China.

Prof. Boqin Qiang, academician of CAS, is Director and Chief Scientist of CHGB. Prof. Wu Min, academician of CAS, is the honorary Chairman of the academic committee. Prof. Yan Shen, academician of CAS, Prof. Fuchu He, academician of CAS, Prof. Dalong Ma, and Prof. Biao Chen are deputy directors of CHGB.

See also
Beijing Genomics Institute
List of genetics research organizations

External links
Official website
National Center for Gene Research, CAS (中国科学院国家基因研究中心)

Human genome projects
Genetics or genomics research institutions
Research institutes in China
Medical and health organizations based in China